Proportionate reduction of error (PRE) is the gain in precision of predicting dependent variable  from knowing the independent variable  (or a collection of multiple variables). It is a goodness of fit measure of statistical models, and forms the mathematical basis for several correlation coefficients. The summary statistics is particularly useful and popular when used to evaluate models where the dependent variable is binary, taking on values {0,1}.

Example 
If both  and  vectors have cardinal (interval or rational) scale, then without knowing , the best predictor for an unknown  would be , the arithmetic mean of the -data. The total prediction error would be  .

Its square root is Pearson's product-moment correlation .

There are several other correlation coefficients that have PRE interpretation and are used for variables of different scales:

References 

Statistical forecasting